Lunamatrona is a comune (municipality) in the Province of South Sardinia in the Italian region Sardinia, located about  northwest of Cagliari and about  north of Sanluri, in the inner Marmilla plain.

Lunamatrona borders the following municipalities: Collinas, Pauli Arbarei, Sanluri, Siddi, Villamar, Villanovaforru.

References

Cities and towns in Sardinia